The 2015 Eskişehir Cup was a professional tennis tournament played on hard courts. It was the 2nd edition of the tournament which was part of the 2015 ATP Challenger Tour. It took place in Eskişehir, Turkey between 18 and 24 May 2015.

Singles main-draw entrants

Seeds

 1 Rankings are as of May 11, 2015.

Other entrants
The following players received wildcards into the singles main draw:
  Barış Ergüden
  Cem İlkel
  Anıl Yüksel
  Grega Žemlja

The following players received entry from the qualifying draw:
  Ricardo Rodríguez
  Yaraslav Shyla
  Filip Veger
  Tucker Vorster

Champions

Singles

 Paolo Lorenzi def.  Íñigo Cervantes, 7–6(7–4), 7–6(7–5)

Doubles

 Sergey Betov  /  Mikhail Elgin def.  Chen Ti /  Ruan Roelofse, 6–4, 6–7(2–7), [10–7]

External links
Official Website

Eskisehir Cup
Eskişehir Cup
2015 in Turkish tennis